I-0, also known as Interstate Zero, is a piece of anonymous interactive fiction about the adventures of a teenage girl hitch-hiking on an Interstate Highway (in this case the nonexistent Interstate 0).  The main character is Tracy Valencia, a 17 year old college student who is on her way home for Thanksgiving when her car breaks down, leaving her stranded in the middle of a scorching desert.  

It won the Best Game and Best Individual Player Character awards at the 1997 Xyzzy Awards, and was a finalist for six other categories. The game was generally praised for its branching plot structure and multiple puzzle solutions.  The game is available freely online.

Notes

References
Game entry at Baf's guide
Game entry at IFWiki

1990s interactive fiction